Andrejs Prohorenkovs (born 5 February 1977) is a Latvian former professional footballer who played as a midfielder.

Club career
Prohorenkovs was born in Ogre. He started his career with Interskonto in the Latvian Higher League, and has since played for Hutnik Warszawa, Odra Opole and Górnik Zabrze in Poland, Maccabi Kiryat Gat and Maccabi Tel Aviv in Israel, Dynamo Moscow in Russia, Melnā Roze and FK Jūrmala in Latvia, Racing de Ferrol in Spain, Ionikos in Greece, Liepājas Metalurgs, FC Jūrmala and FK Ogre in Latvia.

Prior to the 2014 Latvian First League (second tier) season Prohorenkovs was appointed as the manager of FK Ogre, also remaining a player's role.

International career
Prohorenkovs made 32 appearances for the Latvia national team scoring four goals between 2002 and 2007. He debuted in 2002, and played at the Euro 2004, making an assist for Māris Verpakovskis in Latvia's tournament opening goal against Czech Republic.

Honours
Maccabi Tel Aviv
Israeli Premier League: 2002–03
Israel State Cup: 2004–05

Liepājas Metalurgs
Latvian Higher League: 2009

References

External links

1977 births
Living people
People from Ogre, Latvia
Latvian people of Ukrainian descent
Latvian footballers
Association football midfielders
Latvia international footballers
UEFA Euro 2004 players
Odra Opole players
Górnik Zabrze players
Maccabi Kiryat Gat F.C. players
Maccabi Tel Aviv F.C. players
Ionikos F.C. players
Russian Premier League players
FC Dynamo Moscow players
Racing de Ferrol footballers
FK Daugava (2003) players
FK Liepājas Metalurgs players
FC Jūrmala players
Hutnik Warsaw players
Czuwaj Przemyśl players
Latvian expatriate footballers
Latvian expatriate sportspeople in Poland
Expatriate footballers in Poland
Latvian expatriate sportspeople in Israel
Expatriate footballers in Israel
Latvian expatriate sportspeople in Greece
Expatriate footballers in Greece
Latvian expatriate sportspeople in Russia
Expatriate footballers in Russia
Latvian expatriate sportspeople in Spain
Expatriate footballers in Spain